John Patrick Kavanagh (30 April 1913 – 10 July 1985) was the fourth Catholic Bishop of Dunedin (1957–1985).

Kavanagh was born in Hāwera in 1913. Dunedin's only Catholic secondary school, Kavanagh College, was named after him until 2023. He died in Dunedin on 10 July 1985.

In 2018 public controversy arose as to his handling of clergy and religious abuse allegations during his episcopal tenure. In 2020, Cardinal John Dew instigated an investigation into Kavanagh's actions. The investigation found that Kavanagh failed to investigate abuse claims relating to one priest. In 2022 it was announced that Kavanagh College would be renamed Trinity College from 1 January 2023 in consequence.

References

  Bishop John Patrick Kavanagh, Catholic Hierarchy website (Retrieved 17 January 2011)

20th-century Roman Catholic bishops in New Zealand
New Zealand people of Irish descent
People educated at Sacred Heart College, Auckland
People from Hāwera
Roman Catholic bishops of Dunedin
1913 births
1985 deaths
Holy Cross College, New Zealand alumni
Participants in the Second Vatican Council